Horst Müller was an East German luger who competed during the mid-1970s. He won three medals at the FIL World Luge Championships with two silvers (singles: 1977, doubles: 1975) and a bronze (singles: 1974).

Müller also won a silver medal in the men's doubles event at the 1975 FIL European Luge Championships in Olang, Italy.

References
Hickok sports information on World champions in luge and skeleton.
List of European luge champions 

German male lugers
Possibly living people
Year of birth missing